Elena Mărgărit-Niculescu (-Dobrovolschi, -Fodor) (born 25 October 1936 in Timișoara) is a retired Romanian artistic gymnast who represented Romania at the 1956 Olympic Games and at the 1960 Olympic Games. She is a double Olympic bronze medalist and a world bronze medalist with the team.

References

External links
 
 
 

Living people
1936 births
Sportspeople from Timișoara
Romanian female artistic gymnasts
Gymnasts at the 1956 Summer Olympics
Gymnasts at the 1960 Summer Olympics
Olympic bronze medalists for Romania
Olympic gymnasts of Romania
Medalists at the World Artistic Gymnastics Championships
Olympic medalists in gymnastics
Medalists at the 1960 Summer Olympics
Medalists at the 1956 Summer Olympics
20th-century Romanian women